Tony Avirgan and Martha Honey are a married couple and former journalistic duo who reported on the 1979 Uganda–Tanzania War and Central America in the 1980s. They were unsuccessful plaintiffs in Avirgan v. Hull (1986), a civil suit alleging responsibility for the La Penca bombing, which injured Avirgan. Philip Chrimes credits Honey with, "perhaps more than any other journalist, help[ing] to blow the cover on the illegal North-Secord Contra resupply operation". Journalist Ed Hooper described Avirgan and Honey's book War in Uganda: The Legacy of Idi Amin as an "outstanding eyewitness account" and an "excellent source" on the Uganda–Tanzania War.

Their son, Jody Avirgan, is also a journalist.

Awards

In 1988, Honey received a Centre for Investigative Journalism Award in the Radio category for an Iran-Contra story that aired the year before on Sunday Morning on CBC Radio.

Works

References

Works cited 
 

20th-century American journalists
American male journalists
Married couples
Year of birth missing (living people)
Honey, Martha